Cristian Marian Munteanu (born 10 November 1974 in Isaccea) is a former Romanian football goalkeeper.

Honours

Club
Dinamo București
Romanian Championship League: 2003–2004
Romanian Cup: 2002–03, 2003–04, 2004–05

External links
 
 

1974 births
Living people
People from Tulcea
Romanian footballers
Romanian expatriate footballers
Association football goalkeepers
FC Dinamo București players
FC Progresul București players
FCV Farul Constanța players
ASC Oțelul Galați players
CS Otopeni players
AEK Larnaca FC players
FC Astra Giurgiu players
Liga I players
Romanian expatriate sportspeople in Cyprus
Cypriot First Division players
Expatriate footballers in Cyprus